William Stang (April 21, 1854 – February 2, 1907) was a German-born American prelate of the Roman Catholic Church. He served as the first bishop of the Diocese of Fall River in Massachusetts from 1904 until his death in 1907.

Biography

Early life 
William Stang was born on April 21, 1854 in Langenbrücken in the Grand Duchy of Baden (in present day Germany). He received his early education at the local gymnasium and then attended the minor seminary of Sint-Niklaas in Belgium. Stang entered the American College of Louvain in Leuven, Belgium, in 1875, where he completed his theological studies.

Priesthood 
Stang was ordained to the priesthood on June 15, 1878. After his ordination, Stang Stang briefly taught at the Catholic University of Leuven.  While in Belgium, he was recruited by Thomas Hendricken, bishop of the Diocese of Providence, to minister to German-speaking Catholics in his diocese. 

Stang immigrated to the United States in September 1878, settling in Providence, Rhode Island. He primarily ministered to the German Catholic community while also serving as a curate at the Cathedral of Sts. Peter and Paul in Providence. He was named pastor of St. Anne's Parish in Cranston, Rhode Island, in 1884. He then served as rector of Sts. Peter and Paul Cathedral in Providence, celebrating mass in German there.  Stang's ambition was to establish a German language parish in the diocese, but it never became feasible.

When Matthew Harkins was appointed bishop of Providence in 1886, Stang became one of his closest advisors.  Stang was a driving force behind the establishment of St. Joseph's Hospital in Providence.

In 1895, Stang travelled to Belgium to serve at the Catholic University of Leuven as vice-rector and professor of moral theology. At Harkins' urging, Stang returned to Providence in 1899.  While supervising St. Joseph's Hospital, he also became head of the diocesan mission band. He was named pastor of St. Edward's Parish in 1901 and also served as chancellor of the diocese.

Bishop of Fall River 
On March 12, 1904, Stang was appointed the first bishop of the newly created Diocese of Fall River by Pope Pius X. He received his episcopal consecration on May 1, 1904, from Bishop Matthew Harkins, with Bishops Michael Tierney and John Brady serving as co-consecrators, at Sts. Peter and Paul Cathedral.  On May 8, 1904, the cathedral was packed with worshippers for Stang's first mass, with police detachments controlling the crowd, estimated at 25,000 people, on the street outside the building.

During his short tenure as bishop, Stang established eleven parishes and founded Saint Anne's Hospital in Fall River, Massachusetts.  One of the new parishes was St. Boniface, a German parish in New Bedford, Massachusetts. Stang once described divorce as a "pernicious practice...contrary to the moral order and the law of Christ," and condemned Saturday dances as "a source of scandal [that] must be stopped at once."

Stang authored a book titled Socialism and Christianity,  which supported the rights of workers to organize in labor unions, but condemned socialism.  In May 1905, Stang addressed 4,000 attendees of the New York German Catholic State Federation meeting in Carnegie Hall in New York City, speaking about the Catholic Church and the papacy.

Death and legacy 
In January 1907, Stang travelled to the Mayo Clinic in Rochester, Minnesota, for surgery to removed an intestinal tumor. The surgery was successful, but he developed an infection.  William Stang died on February 2, 1907, in the hospital in Rochester at age 52.Bishop Stang High School in North Dartmouth, Massachusetts, is named in his honor.

See also

 Catholic Church hierarchy
 Catholic Church in the United States
 Historical list of the Catholic bishops of the United States
 List of Catholic bishops of the United States
 Lists of patriarchs, archbishops, and bishops

Notes

References

Publications
 Pastoral theology (New York, 1897)
 Historiographia Ecclesiastica quam historiae seriam solidamque operam navantibus (Freiburg, 1897)
 Business Guide for Priests (New York, 1899)
 The Devil, Who He Is and What He Does (Providence, 1900)
 Sozialismus und Christentum, with Rudolf Amberg ("Socialism and Christendom," Einsiedeln, 1907)
 The Holy Hour of Adoration (New York, 1907)
 Medulla fundamentalis theologiae moralis quam seminaristis et presbyteris (Neo-Eboraci, Cincinnati, 1907)
 Life of Martin Luther
 The Eve of the Reformation
 More About the Huguenots
 Germany's Debt to Ireland
 Spiritual Pepper and Salt

Episcopal succession

1854 births
1907 deaths
German emigrants to the United States
Roman Catholic Diocese of Providence
20th-century Roman Catholic bishops in the United States
Catholic University of Leuven (1834–1968) alumni
American College of the Immaculate Conception alumni
Roman Catholic bishops of Fall River
19th-century American Roman Catholic priests